Sirotan is a Japanese merchandise character created by Creative Yoko.

Merchandise
Sirotan is a young harp seal, white in colour but often disguised as other cute animals and objects. He was born on August 8, 1999, in Northern Iceland. Sirotan's favourite things to do are napping and swimming in the ocean. His favourite foods are fish, ice-cream, confectionery and milk. He loves dressing up and playing.  "Sirotan" literally means, "Widdle White," the childish version of "Little White." He is also nicknamed Shironai. Some call him 屎撈蛋, but he does not have an official Chinese name. He is a hardworking one, and loves people who are hardworking too.

There are four members in his family. They are his mother, his father, his older brother and his grandmother. In additional, he has six close friends. They are Kametan - the turtle, Penta - the penguin, Usamomo - the rabbit, Irukakun - the dolphin, Mokota - the sheep and Bakketan - the toy bear which is made by Sirotan's mother.

History

The first theme shop that is dedicated to Sirotan is currently found at Haneda Airport.

References

External links

Stuffed toys